Boris Sarkisovich Kevorkov (1932–1998) was the First Secretary of the "Nagorno-Karabakh Autonomous Oblast Committee" of the Communist Party of the Azerbaijan Soviet Socialist Republic. He was appointed in 1973 and was dismissed in February 1988.

Biography
Kevorkov was born in Shamakhi to an Armenian family. He was appointed Secretary of the Nagorno-Karabakh Autonomous Oblast in 1973, the middle of the Brezhnev era. His predecessor Gurgen Melkumyan was removed after leader of the Communist Party of Azerbaijan SSR Heydar Aliyev came into conflict with the Armenian leadership of the autonomous oblast. Melkumyan was a native of Nagorno-Karabakh, unlike Kevorkov.

Although an Armenian, Kevorkov was very loyal to Aliyev and other Azerbaijani leaders in Baku, and was resented by the Armenian community. He was married to an Azerbaijani woman. Kevorkov reportedly never once visited Armenia during his fourteen years in the post.

During the Karabakh movement, 87 Armenian deputies from the Regional Soviet called an emergency session of the assembly on 20 February 1988 in response to Armenian demonstrations in Stepanakert calling for the unification of Karabakh and Armenia. Kevorkov and First Secretary of the Azerbaijan Communist Party Kamran Baghirov tried and failed to stop the session from taking place. Late in the evening, 110 Armenian deputies voted unanimously for the resolution, calling for Nagorno-Karabakh to join Soviet Armenia. The Azerbaijani deputies refused to vote. Kevorkov tried to steal the stamp needed to confirm the resolution.

On 24 February 1988, Kevorkov was removed from office by Moscow emissaries. His deputy, Genrikh Poghosyan, who was much more popular among Armenians, took his place.

Last years
As the First Nagorno-Karabakh War intensified, Kevorkov decided to move to Moscow, but was arrested at the airport by the Azerbaijani authorities on May 24, 1992. Kevorkov was released from a Baku jail in 1993 by the decree of President Heydar Aliyev. He subsequently settled in Moscow and worked as a middle school history teacher. He died there in December 1998.

References

Bibliography

1932 births
1998 deaths
People from Shamakhi
Politicians from the Republic of Artsakh
Ninth convocation members of the Soviet of Nationalities
Tenth convocation members of the Soviet of Nationalities
Eleventh convocation members of the Soviet of Nationalities
Expelled members of the Communist Party of the Soviet Union
Recipients of the Order of Friendship of Peoples
Recipients of the Order of Lenin
Recipients of the Order of the Red Banner of Labour
First Nagorno-Karabakh War
Azerbaijani politicians
Soviet politicians
Soviet Armenians